AGS Airports Limited is the United Kingdom-based owner of Aberdeen, Glasgow and Southampton Airports. The company was formed in September 2014 by Ferrovial, a Spanish firm specialising in the design, construction, financing, operation and maintenance of transport, urban and services infrastructure, and Macquarie Group, an Australian company, composed of diversified financial services. Each own a 50%  stake in the company. The company acquired Aberdeen, Glasgow and Southampton Airports in December 2014 from Heathrow Airport Holdings (formerly BAA).

History
Aberdeen, Glasgow and Southampton Airports were originally owned and operated by the British Airports Authority, who acquired them in the 1970s. In the late 1980s the authority was sold off by the government and became BAA plc. By 2012 BAA had sold off three of their seven airports and rebranded as Heathrow Airport Holdings (HAH). In 2014 HAH decided to sell off Aberdeen, Glasgow and Southampton to enable the company to focus on improving Heathrow for passengers and winning support for Heathrow expansion.

In January 2021, a number of new appointments to the executive committee were announced, including Mark Johnston as chief operating officer for AGS Airports, reporting to AGS chief executive Derek Provan.

Airports 

AGS owns and operates three airports:
 Aberdeen Airport
 Glasgow Airport	 
 Southampton Airport

References

External links 
 

Transport operators of the United Kingdom
 
Airport operators
British companies established in 2014